Faerber or Färber is a German surname. Notable people with the surname include:

Hans-Johann Färber (born 1947), German rower
Hermann Färber (born 1963), German politician
Jay Faerber (born 1972),  American comic book writer
Jörg Faerber (1929–2022), German conductor
Winston Faerber (born 1971), Dutch-Surinamese football player

See also
Farber
Ferber

German-language surnames